Mukti is the concept of spiritual liberation (Moksha or Nirvana) in Indian religions, including jivan mukti, para mukti.

Mukti may also refer to:

Film
 Mukti (1937 film), a Hindi- and Bengali-language Indian film
 Mukti (1960 film), an Indian film starring Nalini Jaywant
 Mukti Asm, a 1973 Assamese-language film, to which the Indian classical singer Parveen Sultana contributed a song
 Mukti (1977 film), a Hindi-language Indian film
 Mukti (Oriya film), a 1977 Odia-language Indian film that won the Odisha State Film Award for Best Actress
 Mukti (web series), a Bengali-language Indian webseries

People
 Mukti Ali (1923–2004), Indonesian government minister
 Mukti Mohan (born 1987), Indian dancer and actress
 Mukti (actress), actress in the 2002 Bengali-language Bangladeshi film Hason Raja
 Mukti Ali Raja, Indonesian footballer in the 2012 Liga Indonesia Premier Division Final
 Mukti Anwar, cast member in the 1993 Indo-BangladeshI film Padma Nadir Majhi
 Mukti Bahadur Khadka, Nepalese runner in the 2014 Asian Games
 Mukti Lal, Indian member of the 1967 Rajasthan legislative assembly from Neem Ka Thana
 Mukti Nath Bhatta, Nepalese ambassador to Denmark
 Mukti Pathak, Nepalese marathon runner in the 1995 Summer Universiade
 Mukti Prasad Sharma, Nepalese politician in the legislative elections of Nepal 1994 and 1999
 Mukti Roy, Indian runner in the 2000 IAAF World Cross Country Championships
 Mukti Saha, Indian runner in the 2002 Asian Athletics Championships

Other
 Mukti (newspaper), a weekly newspaper in Purulia, West Bengal, India

See also
 Moksha (disambiguation)